Konni Aanakkoodu located in Konni is a well known training center for elephant's in Kerala. Its at a distance of 11 km from Pathanamthitta town.

Anakkoodu (Cage)
The prime attraction here are the huge cages of wood built to house elephants. These cages are locally known as Aanakkoodu and can accommodate 3 to 4 elephants at a time.

Training process

The trainers here train the baby elephants which get separated from their herd, or are found wounded or roaming in the forest. Experienced trainers, using their systematic training methods, tame the baby elephants.

Visitor access
Visitors can get a close look at these elephants and can observe and understand a lot about their behaviour, especially that of baby elephants, which are often endearingly mischievous.

Older practice
Konni is famous for the elephant training centre since ancient times. The elephants were captured from the dense forests of the western ghats/Sahyadri and brought to the elephant training cage at Konni.
There these wild elephants are tamed and trained by mahouts specialized as elephant trainers. These trainers take the help of other tamed elephants.

Prominent elephants
The tamed elephants famous for rendering help to the trainers of the wild ones are;
 Konniyil Kochchayyappan
 Ranji Padmanabhan
 Balakrishnan
 Soman
 Venu
 Rameshan
 Mani

Elephants in Konni
There are five elephants at present in Konni Elephant Training Center. Krishna is the youngest member who is only nine years old.

 Priyadarshini
 Meena
 Surendran (presently at TN for kumki elephant training)
 Eva
 Krishna.

Early history

The elephant capturing at Konni traces back to 1810 AD. The major elephant capturing locations include Mundom Moozhy, Mannarappara and Thura. The elephant training cage which is present now was built in 1942. The wood of "Kambakam" (Hopea ponga) was used for this. The present training cage has the capacity to train 6 elephants. The dimensions of the training cage are 12.65×8.60×7 metres.
The elephant training cage and its premises comprises  of land. The elephant capturing was officially stopped in 1977 by Govt: Circular though it was actually stopped many years prior to that.

Tourism
Presently the elephant training cage is a major tourist attraction.

It houses a history museum as well. The elephant training centre functions as an elephant welfare centre. The elephant calves estranged from the herd and found lost in the forest are brought here and are provided with medical facilities and proper care. Medicinal Plants are also grown here and there is an Eco-Store to buy medicinal and forest based natural goods.

Documentation
The details of Konni Elephant Training Centre and Training Cage are mentioned in the articles of the famous Aithihyamaala by Shri Kottarathil Shankunni. "Aithihyamaala" is referred as one of rare collection of articles of Kerala History.

Gift to Portugal
Konni Elephant Training Centre has to its credit of gifting the Elephant Samyuktha to the Republic of Portugal as a mark of friendship and co-operation with the Republic of India.

How to reach
Konni is on the Main Eastern Highway (Punalur-Pathanamthitta-Muvattupuzha Highway/SH-08) and is very well connected to major towns and cities of Kerala through Pathanamthitta.

Railway

The nearest Railway station is punalur, 25 km and Chengannur Thiruvalla which is around 41 km.kottayam60.

Airport

The nearest Airport is Thiruvananthapuram International Airport, about 99 km from Pathanamthitta. The Cochin International Airport is around 124 km from Konni.

Image Gallery

See also
Kodanad Abhayaranyam animal shelter and elephant training centre
Kottur Elephant Sanctuary and Rehabilation Centre

References 

Cities and towns in Pathanamthitta district
Elephant reserves of India
Wildlife sanctuaries in Kerala
Education in Pathanamthitta district
1942 establishments in India
Protected areas established in 1942
Educational institutions established in 1942